The Crooked Road is a 1940 American drama film directed by Phil Rosen and written by Richard Blake, Joseph Krumgold and Garnett Weston. The film stars Edmund Lowe, Irene Hervey, Henry Wilcoxon, Paul Fix, Arthur Loft and Claire Carleton. The film was released on May 10, 1940, by Republic Pictures.

Plot

Cast
Edmund Lowe as Danny Driscoll / John Vincent / George Atwater
Irene Hervey as Louise Dalton
Henry Wilcoxon as Bob Trent
Paul Fix as Nick Romero
Arthur Loft as Carl Gobel
Claire Carleton as Virgie Gobel
Charles Lane as Phil Wesner

References

External links
 

1940 films
1940s English-language films
American drama films
1940 drama films
Republic Pictures films
Films directed by Phil Rosen
Films scored by William Lava
American black-and-white films
1940s American films